The 2015–16 Blackwater Elite season was the second season of the franchise in the Philippine Basketball Association (PBA).

Key dates

2015
August 23: The 2015 PBA draft took place in Midtown Atrium, Robinson Place Manila.

Draft picks

Roster

Philippine Cup

Eliminations

Standings

Playoffs

Bracket

Commissioner's Cup

Eliminations

Standings

Governors' Cup

Eliminations

Standings

Transactions

Free agent signings

Trades
Off-season

Commissioner's Cup

Governors' Cup

Recruited imports

References

Blackwater Bossing seasons
Blackwater